{{DISPLAYTITLE:5-HT1 receptor}}
The 5-HT1 receptors are a subfamily of the 5-HT serotonin receptors that bind to the endogenous neurotransmitter serotonin (also known as 5-hydroxytryptamine, or 5-HT). The 5-HT1 subfamily consists of five G protein-coupled receptors (GPCRs) that are coupled to Gi/Go and mediate inhibitory neurotransmission, including 5-HT1A, 5-HT1B, 5-HT1D, 5-HT1E, and 5-HT1F. There is no 5-HT1C receptor, as it was reclassified as the 5-HT2C receptor. For more information, please see the respective main articles of the individual subtypes:

See also
 5-HT2 receptor
 5-HT3 receptor
 5-HT4 receptor
 5-HT5 receptor
 5-HT6 receptor
 5-HT7 receptor

References

Serotonin receptors